Saba Comprehensive School (SCS) is the sole secondary and vocational school in Saba, located in St. Johns.

It was established on November 22, 1976, with 100 Antillean guilders from the cofounders. Previously, Saba children wanting to take  (MAVO) 3 and 4 classes had to go to St. Maarten; SCS began its MAVO 3 and 4 classes in 1988 and 1990, respectively. English became the medium of instruction in the 1990–1991 school year. The school was previously in The Bottom.

References

External links
 Saba Comprehensive School

Secondary schools in the Dutch Caribbean
Education in Saba
Buildings and structures in Saba
Educational institutions established in 1976
1976 establishments in the Netherlands Antilles